Dawa Sherpa may refer to:
Dawa Dachhiri Sherpa (born 1969) a Nepalese trail runner and a cross-country skier
Chhang Dawa Sherpa (born 1982) a Nepalese mountaineer and the youngest mountaineer to summit the 14 highest peaks
Dawa Yangzum Sherpa (born 1990) a Nepali female mountain climber and first female international mountain guide from Nepal